Andrew Ekai Eyapan (born December 12, 1965) is a long-distance runner from Kenya, who won the 1998 edition of the Vienna Marathon. He is a former race walker, who won the bronze medal in the men's 20 km Walk at the 1990 African Championships in Cairo, Egypt. He won the Berlin Half Marathon in 1998.

Achievements

External links

2000 Marathon Year Ranking

1965 births
Living people
Kenyan male racewalkers
Kenyan male long-distance runners
Place of birth missing (living people)
Kenyan male marathon runners
20th-century Kenyan people
21st-century Kenyan people